Srebrenko Repčić (born 1 December 1954) is a football manager and former player.

He made his name while playing as an attacking midfielder for FK Sarajevo in partnership with likes of Safet Sušić, Predrag Pašić, and Radomir Savić.

Playing career

Club
He started playing as senior with FK Borac Šamac having only 15 years and he also played for FK Sloga Doboj before moving to FK Sarajevo. He finished off his playing days with stints with Fenerbahçe (103 matches and 31 goals) in Turkey between 1983–1985, Standard Liège in Belgium and France with En Avant Guingamp. He earned one cap for the Yugoslavia national football team.
 
Alter impressing at FK Sarajevo, where he led the club's scoring charts for four seasons, Repčić, together with Radomir Savić, made a transfer to Red Star Belgrade in the summer of 1979. In his first season in Belgrade (1979/80), he scored 7 league goals in 33 appearances. He also had a memorable showing in that season's UEFA Cup round-of-16 second leg match versus Bayern Munich. Red Star was 0-2 down after 1st leg in Munich, but led 3-0 in the 50th minute of the return leg at Marakana courtesy of Repčić double and another goal by "Pižon" Petrović. They couldn't hold on as Germans countered with two quick goals for 3-2 on the night that spelled painful exit for Red Star.

Repčić moved on from Red Star in the summer of 1983.

International career
He made one senior appearance for Yugoslavia, coming on as a second half substitute for Zlatko Vujović in a March 1980 friendly match against Uruguay.

Managerial career
After he wrapped up his career as a player, Repčić tried his hand at coaching. He worked at a French club Levallois Sporting Club Football. During the 1996/97 season, he coached Didier Drogba who was 18 at the time.

Personal life
Repčić's son Vedran became involved in organized crime at an early age and served ten years in prison for his involvement in a robbery and murder committed in 1998. After Vedran's release from prison, an attempt on his life was made in November 2015. He survived the shooting, but suffered irreparable damages (a fragment of one of the bullets was embedded in his skull). In November 2020, he was the victim of a second assassination attempt - this time, an unidentified man shot him to death in Belgrade.

Club stats

References

External links

 
 

1954 births
Living people
People from Šamac, Bosnia and Herzegovina
Serbs of Bosnia and Herzegovina
Association football midfielders
Yugoslav footballers
Yugoslavia international footballers
Olympic footballers of Yugoslavia
Footballers at the 1980 Summer Olympics
FK Borac Šamac players
FK Sloga Doboj players
FK Sarajevo players
Red Star Belgrade footballers
Fenerbahçe S.K. footballers
Standard Liège players
En Avant Guingamp players
Yugoslav First League players
Süper Lig players
Belgian Pro League players
Ligue 2 players
Yugoslav expatriate footballers
Expatriate footballers in Turkey
Yugoslav expatriate sportspeople in Turkey
Expatriate footballers in Belgium
Yugoslav expatriate sportspeople in Belgium
Expatriate footballers in France
Yugoslav expatriate sportspeople in France